Widener University is a private university in Chester, Pennsylvania. The university has three other campuses: two in Pennsylvania (Harrisburg and Exton) and one in Wilmington, Delaware.

Founded as The Bullock School for Boys in 1821, the school was established in Wilmington, Delaware. It became The Alsop School for Boys from 1846 to 1853, and then Hyatt's Select School for Boys from 1853 to 1859. Military instruction was introduced in 1858, and the school changed its name in 1859 to Delaware Military Academy. It moved to Pennsylvania in 1862 and became Chester County Military Academy. It was known as Pennsylvania Military College after 1892 and adopted the Widener name in 1972.

About 3,300 undergraduates and 3,300 graduate students attend Widener in eight degree-granting schools.  The university offers associate, baccalaureate, master's, and doctoral degrees in areas ranging from traditional liberal arts to professional programs. It is classified among "Doctoral/Professional Universities" and a "Community Engagement Institution".

History

Widener University was founded in 1821 as the Bullock School for Boys preparatory school in Wilmington, Delaware, by John Bullock.  Bullock operated the school until 1846 when it was sold to Samuel Alsop and renamed the Alsop School for Boys. In 1853, the school was sold to Theodore Hyatt and renamed the Hyatt's Select School for Boys, and again in 1859 to the Delaware Military Academy.  In 1862, the school moved to West Chester, Pennsylvania.  By act of assembly on April 8, 1862, the Pennsylvania legislature incorporated the school as a university under the name of Chester County Military Academy.  In 1865, the school moved to Chester, Pennsylvania, and occupied the building which would become the Old Main building of the Crozer Theological Seminary. By 1868, the school outgrew the Crozer Old Main building and relocated to its current location.

From 1892 to 1966, the school was known as Pennsylvania Military College (PMC) and was under the direction of General Charles Hyatt. PMC was once one of the nation's senior military colleges. In 1869, Pennsylvania Military College was the first school to have a U.S. Army detail stationed at the school and to receive federal arms for training.  In 1904, the school was recognized on the first list of distinguished institutions published by the U.S. War Department. In 1923, "American March King" John Philip Sousa wrote and dedicated "The Dauntless Battalion" march to PMC's President (Colonel Charles E. Hyatt), the faculty and the cadets of PMC. Sousa had been presented with an honorary doctor of music degree by the college in 1920, and he was impressed by the cadet cavalry horsemen.

In 1966, the school changed its name again to PMC Colleges, which incorporated Pennsylvania Military College as well as Penn Morton College, which had a non-military, co-educational curriculum.  The school expanded the Chester campus from 25 acres to 90 acres.  Graduate programs were introduced in 1966, and female students were first enrolled in 1967.

In 1972, the institution was renamed Widener College to honor the memory of Eleanor Elkins Widener, the maternal grandmother of Fitz Eugene Dixon Jr., a generous supporter of the organization over four decades and a member of the prominent Widener family of Philadelphia.  The Corps of Cadets disbanded, although an Army ROTC program was retained.  The Widener University School of Law was acquired in 1975, which was split in 2015 to become two separate law schools: one on the Delaware campus and another in Harrisburg – Widener University Commonwealth Law School. In recognition of its comprehensive offerings, Widener College became Widener University in 1979. Today, Widener is a four-campus university offering more than 80 programs of study.

Architecture

The Manor House was designed and built by Jonathan Edwards Woodbridge in 1888 at 14th and Potter Street.  It was a wedding gift to his wife, Louise Deshong, and was originally named "The Louise".  It was modeled after the late 19th-century English country manor style and is unique for its hand-made brick construction.

The house was given to the city of Chester as a home for young women.  In 1976, Widener University purchased the home for use as a student residence.   It later became home to the Phi Sigma Sigma sorority.  The home is currently used by Widener University as a student dormitory.

The Old Main and Chemistry Building were listed on the National Register of Historic Places in 1978.

Timeline
Throughout its long history, the university has undergone several name changes.  The following table details the various names Widener has held over the years as well as any significant organizational changes that occurred during each period.

Campuses
Widener consists of four campuses, the Main Campus in Chester, Pennsylvania, plus campuses in Wilmington, Delaware, Harrisburg, Pennsylvania, and Exton, Pennsylvania.  Founded in 1866 after the school moved to Chester, the  main campus consists of over 100 buildings and serves all undergraduate day students as well as Continuing Studies, Osher Lifelong Learning Institute (OLLI) students, and graduate students.  Widener's graduate programs include business, education, engineering, nursing, social work, physical therapy, and clinical psychology.

It contains the School of Law as well as the Legal Education Institute. Some classes for Continuing Studies students and graduate business students are also held here. The  Harrisburg Campus, opening in 1989, contains the Widener University Commonwealth Law School and has graduate programs in nursing and social work held there. In July 2015, Widener School of Law, which used to be one school sitting on the Delaware and Harrisburg campuses, split to become Widener University Delaware Law School in Wilmington and Widener University Commonwealth Law School in Harrisburg.

Starting in 2004, the Exton Campus was added to Widener's growing institution. It is located in a business park  from the Main Campus.  It primarily serves Continuing Studies students and contains Widener's Osher Lifelong Learning Institute (OLLI), which provides continuing education programs for retired adults.

Academics
Widener's academic offerings include over 50 undergraduate majors, 40 minors, and more than 30 graduate programs of study.  Widener has an undergraduate student to faculty ratio of 12:1 with 90% of the full-time faculty having doctorates or the highest degree in their field.  In addition, 60% of all classes contain less than 20 students.

Libraries and museums

The Wolfgram Memorial Library contains 242,000 volumes, 175,000 microfilms, 12,000 audio-visual materials and 1,960 serial subscriptions.

In 1979, Widener University leased and restored the Deshong Art Museum located on Edgemont Avenue in Chester.  The Deshong Art Museum was built in 1914 after the death of the art collector and wealthy industrialist Alfred O. Deshong left his trust and land to the city of Chester.  Deshong donated over 300 pieces of art to the museum including carved Japanese ivory figures, Chinese carved hard stone vessels and 19th century American and European paintings.

Over the years, the museum fell into disrepair and in July 1984 the trustees that managed the art museum dissolved the trust.  The Asian and impressionistic art collection were given to Widener University and are displayed in their permanent collection.

The PMC Museum highlights the legacy of the Pennsylvania Military Academy of Cadets with exhibits of sabres, uniforms, scrapbooks, newspapers and yearbooks.

Rankings and classifications
In 2013, Widener was named a finalist for the President's Higher Education Community Service Honor Roll Presidential award – one of only 14 institutions in the nation to receive that honor. The university has made the honor roll every year since its inception in 2006. The 2018 Best Colleges list from U.S. News & World Report ranked Widener as tied for 192nd among 311 national universities, with a score of 32 out of 100.  It also ranked Widener's undergraduate engineering program 103rd among all 200 programs whose highest engineering degree is a bachelor's or master's.  Out of the 262 national universities ranked, Widener is 55th in the category "Highest Proportion of Classes Under 20 Students".  The 2008 U.S. News & World Report's Best Graduate Schools ranks several of Widener's graduate programs:
clinical psychology → #145,
health care management → #49,
nursing → #141,
physical therapy → #173,
and social work → #140.

Athletics
Widener has 22 varsity teams (11 for men and 11 for women) participating in Division III within the MAC Commonwealth of the Middle Atlantic Conferences (MAC). Formerly known as the Pioneers, their nickname changed to the Pride in the Fall of 2006 after a student poll.  Widener sports teams include:
Men's and Women's varsity: basketball, cross country, lacrosse, soccer, swimming, indoor track and field, outdoor track and field, volleyball and golf. 
Men's varsity: baseball and football
Women's varsity: field hockey and softball
Co-ed Varsity:  esports
Club sports: men's ice hockey, men's rugby union, women's rugby, and cheerleading

Athletic achievements
The football team has had recent success winning the MAC championship in 2012 and an "Elite 8" appearance in the Division III Playoffs, the ECAC Southwest Bowl in 2011, and the ECAC South Atlantic Bowl in 2005.  Its greatest success has been winning the NCAA Division III National Championship in 1977 and 1981 under long-time coach Bill Manlove and reaching the semi-finals in 1979, 1980, and 2000. Widener also reached the quarterfinals of the tournament in 2012 before losing to eventual NCAA D-III National Champion, Mount Union, by a lopsided 72–17 score.  In 2014, the team again won the MAC championship and eventually lost in the NCAA Division III tournament in the "Elite Eight" to Linfield by a score of 45–7.  Additionally, Widener football has won 17 MAC championships, the most of any team in the conference. Billy "White Shoes" Johnson played for Widener in the early 70s.  He went on to be an all-pro NFL player and was selected to the NFL 75th Anniversary All-Time Team as well as the College Football Hall of Fame.

The men's basketball team has won 15 MAC titles and appeared in the NCAA Division III Tournament 17 times, advancing to the "Sweet 16" in 1987 and 2006, the "Final 4" in 1985, and the championship game in 1978.  The men's lacrosse team has appeared in the NCAA Tournament 8 times since 2000 and has won 12 MAC titles since 1996.  The men's swimming team has won 12 MAC titles since 1994.

Athletic facilities
The Schwartz Athletic Center is home to basketball, swimming, indoor track, and volleyball.  It houses a newly renovated  by 25 meter 10-lane competition swimming pool, squash/racquetball courts, and administrative offices for the athletic department.  Schwartz is also home to the new Wellness Center, opened in April 2006 to provide the faculty, staff, and students with additional recreational and fitness opportunities.  In addition to exercise equipment, the Wellness Center provides fitness classes and a  rock climbing wall.

Opening in 1994, Leslie C. Quick Jr. Stadium seats over 4,000 people and has a turf playing field surrounded by an 8-lane track.  The stadium houses the football, soccer, men's lacrosse, and outdoor track & field teams.  In addition, Edith R. Dixon Field, opening in 2005,  houses the women's field hockey and lacrosse teams.  It sports an artificial turf, lighting, and a scoreboard.  The field is also used for the intramural teams.

In Fall 2019, the Esports Arena in the basement of University Center opened for the inaugural season of the esports program. The arena includes 26 top-of-the-line gaming PCs and serves as both a practice and competition space for the athletes.

The Philadelphia Eagles held their summer training camp on Widener's campus between 1973 and 1979.  The 2006 movie Invincible depicts the campus during the Eagles' 1976 summer training camp.  Since 2006, the Philadelphia Soul have held practices at Widener as well.

Student life

Enrollment
Widener enrolls approximately 6,300 total students including 3,600 undergraduate, 1,700 graduate students, and 1,000 law school students. Among full-time undergraduate students, the male/female ratio is about 0.8:1 (44% male, 56% female). 48% of undergraduates choose to live on the Main Campus while the remaining students live off-campus or commute.  Approximately 54% of all full-time undergraduates are from Pennsylvania with 45% coming from the rest of the country (predominantly Delaware, Maryland, New Jersey, New York, and Virginia), and 1% of students originating from outside the U.S.  The acceptance rate for undergraduate applicants in fall 2013 was 65.5%.

Student clubs and events
The university has over 100 student clubs including honor societies, religious organizations, media groups, and special interest clubs.  Greek Week, Spring Carnival, and Homecoming are among the popular events on campus. Graduate students are currently not allowed to participate in club sports activities.

Media is big on Widener's campus. The Blue&Gold: Widener University's Student Media Site was established in spring 2013. This outlet for student reporting has been growing ever since, telling the news and giving students a voice on campus. TV Club is Widener's student-run television program. WDNR is the student-run campus radio station that plays a variety of music including hip-hop, rock, metal, and punk.

Fraternity and sorority life
Widener has six fraternities and six sororities. Approximately 12% of all undergraduates are members.  Widener's Greek organizations include:
Fraternities: Alpha Tau Omega, Phi Delta Theta, Tau Kappa Epsilon, Kappa Sigma, Theta Chi and Theta Delta Sigma(Co-ed)
Sororities: Alpha Kappa Alpha, Zeta Phi Beta, Delta Phi Epsilon, Phi Sigma Sigma, Sigma Sigma Sigma, and Alpha Omega Epsilon

Community
Widener is one of only 22 colleges that is a member of Project Pericles, an organization promoting social responsibility and addressing civic apathy among students.  It is classified as a Community Engagement Institution.

Widener has several initiatives aimed at benefiting the surrounding community.  These include:
Pennsylvania Small Business Development Center — The school opened the center in 2006 to provide consulting and educational programs to local small businesses and entrepreneurs.  It is one of only 18 in the state and one of 3 in the Philadelphia region (with Temple University and University of Pennsylvania).
Philadelphia Speakers Series — Since 2004, Widener has sponsored this series which has had such notable speakers as Steve Wozniak, Henry Kissinger, Walter Cronkite and Dave Barry.
University Technology Park — A joint project started in 1999 between the university and Crozer-Keystone Health System to foster small business opportunities focusing on health care, science and technology.
Widener University Observatory — The observatory has free public telescope viewings throughout the school year hosted by the physics and astronomy department.

Charter school
In 2006, the university established a new charter school near the Chester campus to serve local residents from kindergarten to grade 5.  Named the Widener Partnership Charter School, the school utilizes the university's programs in education, social work, nursing, and clinical psychology.  This collaboration involves the participation of Widener faculty and students to not only provide educational support but also provide additional assistance outside of school through counseling and health services.

Classes in the charter school started in September 2006, enrolling 50 students in both kindergarten and grade 1.  The school continued to add a new grade each year until grade 8 had been reached, surpassing the initial expectations of the project.

Chester revitalization project
A $50 million revitalization project was started in 2007. The project, named University Crossings, included the addition of a hotel, bookstore, coffee shop, restaurant, and apartments.  The project is expected to have an overall economic impact of $1 million to Chester, as well as creating 100 new jobs.

In 2017, Widener University purchased the Taylor Memorial Arboretum in Nether Providence Township about 1 mile north of the Chester campus.  The university purchased the site from BNY Mellon bank and plans to use the nature reserve for research and hands-on learning opportunities for citizen science projects.

Notable alumni
As of 2011, there were 59,018 total living alumni.

Benjamin P. Ablao, Jr., independent filmmaker and actor
Dawn Marie Addiego, New Jersey state senator (2010-2022)
Richard Alloway, Pennsylvania state senator (2006-2019)
Jesse Matlack Baker, Pennsylvania State Representative for Delaware County (1889-1892), Pennsylvania State Senator for the 9th district (1893-1897)
Peter J. Barnes III, New Jersey Superior Court judge; former state senator
Truxtun Beale, diplomat
Aimee Belgard, New Jersey superior court judge
Dan Borislow, entrepreneur and sports team owner
David J. Brightbill, Pennsylvania state senator from 1982 to 2006
Chris A. Brown, New Jersey state senator
Michael A. Brown, member of the Council of the District of Columbia
Irving J. Carr, U.S. Army Major General
John H. Carrington, North Carolina state senator (1995-2005)
Frederick J. Chiaventone, US Army '73, Lieutenant Colonel, historian, award-winning novelist, screenwriter
Mark B. Cohen,member, Pennsylvania General Assembly (1974-2016)
Clarence C. Combs, Jr., polo player
Carolyn Comitta, member of the Pennsylvania State Senate, first female Mayor of West Chester, Pennsylvania, member of Pennsylvania House of Representatives (2017-2020)
Drew Crompton, political consultant
William J. Crow, member of the Pennsylvania House of Representatives (1947-1949)
Bryan Cutler, member of the Pennsylvania House of Representatives, List of speakers of the Pennsylvania House of Representatives since 2020
Tom Deery, College Football Hall of Fame inductee (1998)
Joseph DeFelice, former chair of the Philadelphia Republican Party and Trump appointee
Cecil B. DeMille, legendary Hollywood director
Joe Fields, New York Jets all-pro center
Ericka Hart, sex educator, writer, and model
Frederic E. Humphreys, first American military pilot
Billy "White Shoes" Johnson, 1974, NFL 75th Anniversary All-Time Team, College Football Hall of Fame inductee (1996)
Jamarr Johnson, basketballer
Brendan Kehoe, author of Zen and the Art of the Internet: A Beginner's Guide and software developer
Benjamin Ralph Kimlau, Chinese American World War II hero (1938–1942)
Walter Francis Layer, Pennsylvania State Representative for Delaware County (1947–1948), Marine Corps Colonel
John Linder, Mayor of Chester, Pennsylvania
Phil Martelli, former St. Joseph's University head basketball coach
Don McGahn, White House Counsel
Matthew McGrory, world's tallest actor
Sylvanus Morley, archaeologist
Patrick J. Murphy, Member of the United States House of Representatives from Pennsylvania (2007-2011), acting United States Secretary of the Army, 2016
Burt Mustin, actor, Gus the Fireman on Leave it to Beaver
D. Lane Powers 1915, represented  in the United States House of Representatives from 1933 to 1945.
Charles F. B. Price, Lieutenant General of the United States Marines, Legion of Merit awardee
Leslie C. Quick Jr., founder Quick & Reilly Inc.
Pat Quinn, former NHL Coach and General Manager
Barbara Bohannan-Sheppard, Mayor of Chester, Pennsylvania
Gerald J. Spitz, Pennsylvania State Representative for the 162nd district (1977–1984)
Brent Staples, 1973, New York Times editorial writer and author of Parallel Time
Bill Stern, newsreel and sports commentator
Brian Tierney, publisher of The Philadelphia Inquirer and the Philadelphia Daily News
John H. Tilelli, Jr., 1963, United States Army four-star general
Dan Yemin, musician

References

External links 

 

 
Educational institutions established in 1821
Eastern Pennsylvania Rugby Union
Widener family
Universities and colleges in Delaware County, Pennsylvania
Universities and colleges in Dauphin County, Pennsylvania
Chester, Pennsylvania
1821 establishments in Pennsylvania
Private universities and colleges in Pennsylvania